Fra' Gherardo Hercolani Fava Simonetti (born 1941) was the Grand Commander of the Sovereign Military Order of Malta between 2009 and 2011, and as such he was the religious superior of the professed knights and of the knights and dames in obedience.

Biography
Hercolani was born in Bologna, the son of Don Filippo Rinaldo Hercolani Fava Simonetti and of his wife, Donna Francesca Cangini.  He is the grandson of Count Antonio Hercolani Fava Simonetti, who was Lieutenant Grand Master of the Order of Malta from 1951 to 1955.  His grandfather married Donna Marianna Fava Ghisilieri Simonetti, a descendant of the Simonetti from Ancona (Princes of Musone).

Order of Malta
Fra' Gherardo joined the order in 1963 and became a Knight of Justice in 1977. He was elevated to the rank of Bailiff Grand Cross of Justice in 1986. He was the Councillor to the Sovereign Council between 1978 and 1983, the Grand Prior of Lombardy and Venetia between 1984 and 1994, a member of the Sovereign Council from 2006 to 2009, and also the President of the Order's Pilgrimages from 2007 to 2009.

He was elected as Grand Commander at the Chapter General on 12 February 2009. He was responsible for spreading the principles of the Faith, the supervision of the Priories and Subpriories, and the creation of reports for the Holy See. He also was responsible for the Magistral Palace Chapel. Simonetti resigned as Grand Commander of the Order in 2011 for health reasons.

Distinctions 
 : Grand Officer of the Order of Merit of the Italian Republic (4 November 2008)
 : Grand Officer of the Order of Saint-Charles (14 October 2009)
 : Grand Commander of the Sovereign Military Order of Malta

References

External links
Coat of Arms of Fra Hercolani Fava Simonetti by Marco Foppoli
Visit of S.E. Karel Schwarzenberg, Ambassador of the Czech Republic (Pictures)

Knights of Malta
Italian Roman Catholics
People from Bologna
Gherardo Hercolani Fava
Living people
1941 births
Grand Officers of the Order of Saint-Charles